The Geography of Pakistan is a profound blend of landscapes varying from plains to deserts, forests,  and plateaus ranging from the coastal areas of the Arabian Sea in the south to the mountains of the Karakoram, Hindukush, Himalayas ranges in the north. Pakistan geologically overlaps both with the Indian and the Eurasian tectonic plates where its Sindh and Punjab provinces lie on the north-western corner of the Indian plate while Balochistan and most of the Khyber Pakhtunkhwa lie within the Eurasian plate which mainly comprises the Iranian Plateau.

Pakistan is bordered by India to the east, Afghanistan to the northwest and Iran to the west while China borders the country in the northeast. The nation is geopolitically situated within some of the most controversial regional boundaries which share disputes and have many-a-times escalated military tensions between the nations, e.g., that of Kashmir with India and the Durand Line with Afghanistan. Its western borders include the Khyber Pass and Bolan Pass that have served as traditional migration routes between Central Eurasia and South Asia.

At , Pakistan is the 33rd largest country by area, little more than twice the size of the US state of California, and slightly larger than the Canadian province of Alberta.

International boundaries

Afghanistan–Pakistan border 

The border with Afghanistan which is known as the Durand Line, which runs from the Hindu Kush and the Pamir Mountains. A narrow strip of Afghanistan territory called the Wakhan Corridor extends between Pakistan and Tajikistan.

China–Pakistan border 

It carries on south-eastward and ends near the Karakoram Pass. This line was determined from 1961 to 1965 in a series of agreements between China and Pakistan and finally on 3 March 1963 both the governments, of Islamabad and Beijing, formally agreed. It is understood that if the dispute over Kashmir is resolved, the border would need to be discussed again.

India–Pakistan border 

The Northern Areas has five of the world's seventeen highest peaks along with highest range of mountains the Karakoram and Himalayas. It also has such extensive glaciers that it has sometimes been called the "Third Pole". The international border-line has been a matter of pivotal dispute between Pakistan and India ever since 1947, and the Siachen Glacier in northern Kashmir has been an important arena for fighting between the two sides since 1984, although far more soldiers have died of exposure to the cold than from any skirmishes in the conflict between their National Armies facing each other.

The Pakistan-India ceasefire line runs from the Karakoram Pass west-southwest to a point about 130 kilometres northwest of Lahore. This line, about 770 kilometres long, was arranged with United Nations (UNO) assistance at the end of the Indo-Pakistani War of 1947–48. The ceasefire line came into effect on 1 January 1949, after eighteen months of fighting between Indian forces and Pakistani forces and was last adjusted and agreed upon by the two countries according to the Shimla Agreement of 2 July 1972 between Indira Gandhi and Zulfikar Ali Bhutto. Since then, it has been generally known as the Line of Control or the (LoC).

The India–Pakistan border continues irregularly southward for about 1,280 kilometers, following the Radcliffe line, named for Sir Cyril Radcliffe, the head of the British Boundary Commission on the division of the Punjab and Bengal provinces of British India on 13 August 1947.

The southern borders are far less contentious than those in northern Pakistan (Kashmir). The Thar Desert in the province of Sindh is separated in the south from the salt flats of the Rann of Kachchh (Kutch) by a boundary that was first delineated in 1923–24. After independence and dissolution of Empire, Independent and free Pakistan contested the southern boundary of Sindh, and a succession of border incidents resulted. They were less dangerous and less widespread, however, than the conflict that erupted in Kashmir in the Indo-Pakistani War of August 1965 started with this decisive core of issues. These southern hostilities were ended by British mediation during Harold Wilson's era, and both sides accepted the award of the Indo-Pakistan Western Boundary Case Tribunal designated by the UN secretary general himself. The tribunal made its award on 19 February 1968; delimiting a line of 403 kilometres that was later demarcated by joint survey teams, of its original claim of some 9,100 square kilometres, Pakistan was awarded only about 780 square kilometers. Beyond the western terminus of the tribunal's award, the final stretch of Pakistan's border with India is about 80 kilometres long, running east and southeast of Sindh to an inlet of the Arabian Sea.

Iran–Pakistan border 

The boundary with Iran, was first delimited by a British commission in the same year as the Durand Line was demarcated, separating Iran from what was then British India's Baluchistan province. Modern Iran has a province named Sistan va Baluchistan that borders Pakistan and has Baluchis in an ethnic majority. In 1957 Pakistan signed a frontier agreement with Iran in Rawalpindi according to which the border was officially declared and the two countries haven't had this border as a subject of serious dispute at all.

Maritime border 

Contiguous zone

Continental shelf
, or to the edge of the continental margin
Exclusive Economic Zone

Territorial sea

Geographical regions

Pakistan is divided into three major geographic areas: the northern highlands; the Indus River plain, with two major subdivisions corresponding roughly to the provinces of Punjab and Sindh; and the Balochistan Plateau. Some geographers designate additional major regions. For example, the mountain ranges along the western border with Afghanistan are sometimes described separately from the Balochistan Plateau, and on the eastern border with India, south of the Sutlej River, the Thar Desert may be considered separately from the Indus Plain. Nevertheless, the country may conveniently be visualized in general terms as divided in three by an imaginary line drawn eastward from the Khyber Pass and another drawn southwest from Islamabad down the middle of the country. Roughly, then, the northern highlands are north of the imaginary east-west line; the Balochistan Plateau is to the west of the imaginary southwest line; and the Indus Plain lies to the east of that line.

The Northern Highlands

The northern highlands include parts of the Hindu Kush, the Karakoram Range, and the Himalayas. This area includes such famous peaks as K2 (Mount Godwin Austen, at 8,611 meters the second highest peak in the world). More than one-half of the summits are over 4,500 meters, and more than fifty peaks reach above 6,500 meters. Travel through the area is difficult and dangerous, although the government is attempting to develop certain areas into tourist and trekking sites. Because of their rugged topography and the rigors of the climate, the northern highlands and the Himalayas to the east have been formidable barriers to movement into Pakistan throughout history.

South of the northern highlands and west of the Indus River plain are the Safed Koh Range along the Afghanistan border and the Suleiman Range and Kirthar Range, which define the western extent of the province of Sindh and reach almost to the southern coast. The lower reaches are far more arid than those in the north, and they branch into ranges that run generally to the southwest across the province Balochistan. North-south valleys in Balochistan and Sindh have restricted the migration of peoples along the Makran Coast on the Arabian Sea east toward the plains.

Several large passes cut the ranges along the border with Afghanistan. Among them are the Khojak Pass, about eighty kilometres northwest of Quetta in Balochistan; the Khyber Pass, forty kilometres west of Peshawar and leading to Kabul; and the Broghol Pass in the far north, providing access to the Wakhan Corridor.

Less than one-fifth of Pakistan's land area has the potential for intensive agricultural use. Nearly all of the arable land is actively cultivated, but outputs are low by world standards. Cultivation is sparse in the northern mountains, the southern deserts, and the western plateaus, but the Indus River basin in Punjab and northern Sindh has fertile soil that enables Pakistan to feed its population under usual climatic conditions.

The Indus plain

The name Indus comes from the Sanskrit word इन्दु (indu), meaning ocean, from which also come the words Sindh, Hindu, and India. The Indus, one of the great rivers of the world, rises in southwestern Tibet only about 160 kilometres west of the source of the Sutlej River, which first flows through Punjab, India and joins the Indus in Pakistani Punjab, and the Brahmaputra, which runs eastward before turning southwest and flowing through India and, Bangladesh. The catchment area of the Indus is estimated at almost 1 million square kilometres, and all of Pakistan's major rivers—the Kabul, Jhelum, and Chenab—flow into it. The Indus River basin is a large, fertile alluvial plain formed by silt from the Indus. This area has been inhabited by agricultural civilizations for at least 5,000 years.

Balochistan

Balochistan is located at the eastern edge of the Iranian plateau and in the border region between Southwest, Central, and South Asia. It is geographically the largest of the four provinces at 347,190 km² (134,051 square miles) of Pakistani territory; and composes 48% of the total land area of Pakistan. The population density is very low due to the mountainous terrain and scarcity of water. The southern region is known as Makran. The central region is known as Kalat.

The Sulaiman Mountains dominate the northeast corner and the Bolan Pass is a natural route into Afghanistan towards Kandahar. Much of the province south of the Quetta region is sparse desert terrain with pockets of inhabitable towns mostly near rivers and streams. The largest desert is the Kharan Desert which occupies the most of Kharan District.

This area is subject to frequent seismic disturbances because the tectonic plate under the Indian plate hits the plate under Eurasia as it continues to move northward and to push the Himalayas ever higher. The region surrounding Quetta is highly prone to earthquakes. A severe quake in 1931 was followed by one of more destructive force in 1935. The small city of Quetta was almost completely destroyed, and the adjacent military cantonment was heavily damaged. At least 20,000 people were killed. Tremors continue in the vicinity of Quetta. The most recent major earthquakes include the October 2005 Kashmir earthquake in which nearly 10,000 people died and the 2008 Balochistan earthquake occurred in October 2008 in which 215 people were killed. In January 1991 a severe earthquake destroyed entire villages in the Khyber-Pakhtunkhwa, but far fewer people were killed in the quake than died in 1935. A major earthquake centered in the Khyber-Pakhtunkhwa's Kohistan District in 1965 also caused heavy damage.

Climate

Pakistan lies in the temperate zone, immediately above the tropic of cancer. The climate varies from tropical to temperate. Arid conditions exist in the coastal south, characterized by a monsoon season with adequate rainfall and a dry season with lesser rainfall, while abundant rainfall is experienced by the province of Punjab, and wide variations between extremes of temperature at given locations. Rainfall varies from as little as less than 10 inches a year to over 150 inches a year, in various parts of the nation. These generalizations should not, however, obscure the distinct differences existing among particular locations. For example, the coastal area along the Arabian Sea is usually warm, whereas the frozen snow-covered ridges of the Karakoram Range and of other mountains of the far north are so cold year round that they are only accessible by world-class climbers for a few weeks in May and June of each year.

Pakistan has four seasons: a cool, dry winter marked by mild temperatures from December through February; a hot, dry spring from March through May; the summer rainy season, or southwest monsoon period, from June through September; and the retreating monsoon period of October and November. The onset and duration of these seasons vary somewhat according to location.

Hailstorms are common in early spring.

Pakistan's largest city, Karachi, which is also the country's industrial center, is more humid than Islamabad but gets significantly lesser rainfall. Although the summer temperatures do not get as high as those in Punjab, the high humidity causes the residents a great deal of discomfort.

Water resources

Hydrological power is a renewable resource which benefits Pakistan a lot. After the Indus Water Treaty in 1960 World Bank decided that River Sutlej, Ravi and Beas water will be used by India and River Indus, Jhelum and Chenab water will be used by Pakistan. Pakistan was told to build two dams, one tarbela and second Mangla, five barrages, eight link canals, and one gated siphon. For this, India was told to participate 60%, whereas Pakistan, 40%. Pakistan is considering to develop wind turbines to fulfill the demand for electricity. Solar power is now slowly flourishing but it is still installed on a small scale.
 
Pakistan largest river is known as the Indus River which flows from Tibet/China and enters Pakistan through Gilgit Baltistan. The Indus River system is divided into two plains. The Upper Indus Plain starts from northern Pakistan and ends up at Mithankot. The Indus has tributaries on both western and eastern side. The Indus' eastern tributaries are the Jhelum, Chenab, Sutlej, Ravi and Beas. These four rivers flow in Punjab and meet at Panjnad where they are known as Panjnad river. The Indus' western tributaries are the Swat, Kabul, Kurrram, Tochi, Gomal, Zhob rivers. These rivers join the Indus at KPK. At Mithankot these rivers finally meet with the River Indus. After this the Indus flows alone through the Lower Indus Plain. Lower Indus Plain starts from Mithankot up to Thatta where the Indus meets with the Arabian Sea. This place is also known as Indus Delta.

Fuel resources

Pakistan has extensive energy resources, including fairly sizable natural gas reserves, petroleum oil reserves, coal fields and large hydropower potential.

Agriculture

About 26% of Pakistan's total land area is under cultivation and is watered by one of the largest irrigation systems in the world. The most important crops are cotton, wheat, rice, sugarcane, maize, sorghum, millets, pulses, oil seeds, barley, fruits and vegetables, which together account for more than 75% of the value of total crop output.

Fishery

Fishery and fishing industry plays an important role in the national economy of Pakistan. With a coastline of about 1046 km, Pakistan has enough fishery resources that remain to be fully developed. It is also a major source of export earning.

Forestry

About only 4.1% of land in Pakistan is covered with forests. The forests of Pakistan are a main source of food, lumber, paper, fuel wood, latex, medicine as well as used for purposes of wildlife conservation and Eco tourism.

Mining

The Salt Range in the Potwar Plateau has large deposits of rock salt. Pakistan has extensive mineral resources, including fairly sizable reserves of gypsum, limestone, chromites, iron ore, rock salt, silver, gold, precious stones, gems, marbles, tiles, copper, sulfur, fire clay and silica sand.

Environment and conservation

The environmental issues is a great problem for the nature and nation of Pakistan and has been disturbing the balance between economic development and environmental protection. As Pakistan is a large importer of both exhaustible and renewable natural resources and a large consumer of fossil fuels, the Ministry of Environment of Government of Pakistan takes responsibility to conserve and protect the environment.

Current issues: water pollution from raw sewage, industrial wastes, and agricultural runoff; limited natural fresh water resources; a majority of the population does not have access to potable water; deforestation; soil erosion; desertification.

Natural disasters

Pakistan is subject to frequent earthquakes which are often severe (especially in north and west) and severe flooding along the Indus after heavy rains (July and August). Landslides are common in the northern mountains.

Protected areas

There are 35 national parks, 135 wildlife sanctuaries, 160 game reserves, 9 marine and littoral protected areas, 19 protected wetlands and a number of other protected grasslands, shrublands, woodlands and natural monuments.

Tidal Flats
A recent global remote sensing analysis suggested that there were 1,575km² of tidal flats in Pakistan, making it the 20th ranked country in terms of how much tidal flat occurs there.

International agreements
Pakistan is a party to several international agreements related to environment and climate, the most prominent among them are:

Suffix of regions and towns 
Parts of region and settlement names:

 -abad means settled place. Example: Islamabad, Faisalabad.
  -dera means meeting place. Example: Dera Ismail Khan.
  -garh means fort or settlement. Example: Islamgarh.
 -goth means settlement or town. Example: Yousuf Goth.
 -istan means land. Example: Baltistan, Balochistan.
 Khel or -khel denotes a Pashtun sub-tribe. Example: Darra Adam Khel.
 -kot means settlement or town. Example: Islamkot, Sialkot.
 -nagar means house. Example: Islamnagar.
 -pur means settlement or town. Example: Nasarpur.
 -wal means settlement or town. Example: Khanewal.
  -wala  means settlement or town. Example: Gujranwala.
 -tando  means settlement or town. Example: Tando Allahyar.

See also 

 Climate of Pakistan
 Extreme points of Pakistan
 Fisheries Research and Training Institute, Lahore Pakistan
 Geology of Pakistan
 Land border crossings of Pakistan
 Zomia (geography)

References

External links 
 
 Pakistan Geographic